Sowande is a name of Yoruba origin. Notable people with the surname include:

Fela Sowande (1905-1987), Nigerian musician and composer
Tunji Sowande (1912-1996), Nigeria-born United Kingdom lawyer and musician
Bode Sowande (born 1948), Nigerian writer and dramatist

Yoruba-language surnames